Knut Richard Åbrink (January 1, 1889 – October 9, 1973) was a Swedish track and field athlete who competed in the 1912 Summer Olympics. In 1912 he finished sixth in the javelin throw competition and also sixth in the two handed javelin throw event.

References

External links
profile 

1889 births
1973 deaths
Swedish male javelin throwers
Olympic athletes of Sweden
Athletes (track and field) at the 1912 Summer Olympics